Acda en De Munnik was a Dutch cabaret and musical duo, consisting of Thomas Acda and Paul de Munnik. Their songs are generally seen as simply and expertly arranged, so that the attention of the listener is drawn to the lyrics. The lyrics are mostly about love, youth and life. Acda en De Munnik's trademark is the harmonious vocals.

David Middelhoff joined the band when they created their first album in 1997. Drummer Kasper van Kooten and keyboard player Diederik van Vleuten played on their first four albums. Since 2002 they have been replaced by guitarist and keyboardist JB Meijers and drummer Dave van Beek. Together with Van Dik Hout, Acda en de Munnik formed the band De Poema's.

"Niet of nooit geweest" was the first song that made the band famous. It still remains one of the most popular songs in Dutch music history.

Albums

Studio albums
1997 Acda en De Munnik
1998 Naar Huis
2000 Hier Zijn
2002 Groeten uit Maaiveld — the first album that was produced without first performing the songs in the theatre.
2004 Liedjes van Lenny — together with Groeten uit Maaiveld, the basis of the rock opera Ren Lenny Ren.
2007 Nachtmuziek
2009 Jouw Leven Lang Bij Mij
2012 ’t Heerst

Other releases
1997 Zwerf ’On
1999 Op Voorraad Live
2001 Live met het Metropole Orkest
2002 Trilogie
2005 Adem — compilation of greatest hits.

Hit summary
Based on data from the Dutch Top 40.
1998 #2 Niet of nooit geweest
1998 #22 Laat me slapen
1998 tip Het regent zonnestralen
1999 tip Ol' 55
2000 #24 De Kapitein (deel 2)
2001 tip Verkeerd verbonden
2002 #17 Ren Lenny ren
2003 #10 Groeten uit Maaiveld
2003 #30 Mis ik mij
2004 #40 Vandaag ben ik gaan lopen
2004 #36 Totdat ik jou
2005 tip Jaren ver van Hier

See also
Music of the Netherlands

External links
Official site of Acda en de Munnik (Dutch)

Musical groups from Amsterdam
Dutch cabaret performers